Etafedrine (INN) or ethylephedrine is a long-acting bronchodilator and has the brand name Nethaprin. It was previously commercially available as both the free base and as the hydrochloride salt from Sanofi-Aventis (now Sanofi) but is now no longer marketed.

Pharmacology 
Unlike ephedrine and tyramine, etafedrine does not induce the release of epinephrine or norepinephrine and instead acts as a selective β2 adrenoreceptor agonist, thereby mediating its bronchodilator effects.

See also 
 Cinnamedrine

References 

Abandoned drugs
Phenylethanolamines
Bronchodilators
Substituted amphetamines